Broström or Brostrom is a surname, and may refer to:
 Anders Broström  (born 1952), retired Swedish ice hockey player
 Axel Ludvig Broström (1838 – 1905), Swedish shipping owner
 Dan Broström (1870 – 1925), Swedish Naval Minister
 Frida Broström (born 1982), Swedish footballer
 Leonard C. Brostrom (1919 - 1944), US soldier, Medal of Honor recipient